Stavchany may refer to the following places in the Ukraine:

 Stavchany, Chernivtsi Raion, Chernivtsi Oblast, village in Chernivtsi Raion
 Stavchany, Dnistrovskyi Raion, Chernivtsi Oblast, village in Dnistrovskyi Raion
 Stavchany, Khmelnytskyi Oblast, village in Kamianets-Podilskyi Raion
 Stavchany, Lviv Oblast, village in Lviv Raion

See also
Stăuceni (disambiguation), Romanian equivalent